The 2005–06 George Washington Colonials men's basketball team represented George Washington University in the 2005–06 NCAA Division I men's basketball season. The Colonials, led by head coach Karl Hobbs, played their home games at the Charles E. Smith Center in Washington, D.C., as members of the Atlantic 10 Conference. 

The Colonials finished the regular season undefeated in conference play, registering a 26–1 overall record going into the postseason, but they were upset in the quarterfinals of the Atlantic 10 tournament. They earned an at-large bid to the NCAA tournament as the 8th seed in the Atlanta region. George Washington beat 9th-seeded  to earn the program's first NCAA tournament win in 12 years. The team's season came to an end in the 2nd round, when they lost to top-seeded Duke, 74–61.

Roster 

Source

Schedule and results

|-
!colspan=12 style=|Regular season

|-
!colspan=12 style=| Atlantic 10 tournament

|-
!colspan=12 style=| NCAA tournament

Source

Rankings

Source

References

George Washington Colonials men's basketball seasons
George Washington
George Washington
George Washington Colonials men's basketball
George Washington Colonials men's basketball